Marist Regional College is a Roman Catholic, co-educational, secondary school, located in Parklands, a suburb of Burnie, Tasmania, Australia.

Marist Regional College is part of the Marist Schools Australia MSA network of catholic high schools across Australia, and is one of several within Australia and around the world that share the same name of "Marist" College. The college currently caters for around 800 students from Years 7 to 12.

History
Marist Regional College was established in 1972 through the amalgamation of Stella Maris Regional College, run by the Sisters of Mercy, and Marist College run by the Marist Fathers.

Marist College
The Society of Mary (Marists) opened the College in 1959 as a boys’ secondary boarding school, initially known as St James' Marist College, and attracted an Initial enrolment of 90. From 1966 onwards the School had some co-ed classes with Stella Maris Regional Girls' College.

Stella Maris Regional Girls' College 
In 1965, construction of the new Stella Maris Regional Girls' College began on land next to Marist College. In 1966, co-educational classes commenced with a small number of girls attending Marist College for lessons.

Marist Regional College
Marist College and Stella Maris Regional College were merged in 1972 to form Marist Regional College. From this time the College has offered co-educational schooling from Year 7 to Year 12. Marist Regional College opened with 555 students; 405 boys (an all-time high), and 150 girls. Boarder numbers (boys only) were 130. At the end of 1975 the boarding house was closed. With the amalgamation came the new College crest. From Stella Maris Regional College came the star; symbol of Mary, the Patroness. From Marist College came the monogram A.M.; monogram of Mary, from whose name was derived the name “Marist”. The College motto is "Love the Truth”.

Today, Marist Regional College is led by a lay Principal, and retains an emphasis on religious education. The school is managed by lay staff.

The Marist Regional College senior year levels and staff advise the principal on the selection of 20 student leaders who represent the student body during their last year at MRC. They are known as the Student Representative Council (SRC).

Campus
Marist, as the college is colloquially known, is situated less than 1 km from Burnie Park, in suburban Parklands. The school has views over the sports grounds, which continue with views of Bass Strait. It is close to Burnie Primary School, with several other schools, including Hellyer College, Stella Maris primary school, Parklands High School (Burnie), and Burnie High School also located in the City of Burnie.

Sport
Marist Regional College is a member of the Sports Association of Tasmanian Independent Schools (SATIS). The college currently has an Athletics Carnival, Swimming Carnival and Cross Country. Students represent Houses known as McAuley, Chanel, Colin and Frayne, named after significant figures in the founding histories of the mercy Sisters and Marist Fathers. These houses were previously known as Bass, Flinders, Tasman and Cook, after significant explorers in Australia's history.

SATIS premierships 
Marist Regional College has won the following SATIS premierships.

Combined:

 Swimming (2) - 1995, 1996

Boys:

 Basketball - 2015
 Cricket (2) - 1978, 1979
 Football (3) - 1966, 1975, 1976
 Hockey - 2021
 Swimming - 1996
 Tennis (8) - 1984, 1985, 1986, 1988, 1989, 1994, 2012, 2013

Girls:

 Basketball (5) - 2011, 2015, 2019, 2020, 2021
 Football - 2021
 Hockey (2) - 2014, 2020
 Netball (4) - 1987, 1989, 1993, 2007
 Soccer - 2010
 Tennis (3) - 2016, 2017, 2018

Notable alumni
Daryl Coates SC - Assistant Director of Public Prosecutions, Tasmania
Martin Flanagan - journalist
Brendon Gale - AFL football player for the Richmond Tigers, CEO of the AFL Players' Association
Michael Gale - AFL football player for the Richmond Tigers and Fitzroy Lions
David Guest (field hockey) - Member of the Australia national field hockey team and bronze medalist at the Beijing Olympics
 Paul McMahon, Number One ticket holder, Sydney Swans AFL club
Stephen Shane Parry - Government Whip in the Australian Senate; Senator (Liberal) for Tasmania
Hayley Nebauer, Costume Designer for Film and Television
Dan Taylor - Radio Announcer
Maverick Weller-AFL Footballer
Lachie Weller-AFL Footballer
Robbie Fox-AFL Footballer
Brody Mihocek-AFL Footballer
Meagan Kiely-AFLW Footballer
Emma Humphries-AFLW Footballer
Jesse Teinaki - Participant on The Voice (Season 8) and The Voice (Season 9)
Luke Russell AFL footballer

Sexual abuse cases

In 1999, former international cricket umpire Stephen Randall was convicted of 15 charges of indecent assault against nine girls while teaching at Marist Regional College in 1981 and 1982. In 2004, former Marist Regional College priest trainee Paul Ronald Goldsmith was arrested for sexually abusing 20 teenage boys when he was coaching athletics at the school from 1974 to 2000 and for also making his victims play strip poker. He served 6 1/2 years in prison and later died in 2016. In 2007 Gregory Ferguson was sentenced to two years jail (eligible for parole after 12 months) for offences in 1971 against two boys aged 13 at Marist College, Burnie, Tasmania. On 13 December 2007 he was sentenced to an additional three years jail for offences against a third boy. In 2008 a jury found former priest Roger Michael Bellemore guilty on three counts of maintaining a sexual relationship with a young person under the age of 17 years in the 1960s and 1970s while he was at the same college. By December 2018, six priests who taught at the College had been convicted of committing acts of sexual abuse.

See also 

 List of schools in Tasmania
 Catholic education in Australia

References

External links 
 Marist Regional College website

1972 establishments in Australia
Catholic secondary schools in Tasmania
Educational institutions established in 1972
Association of Marist Schools of Australia
Burnie, Tasmania